Witham railway station is on the Great Eastern Main Line (GEML) in the East of England, serving the town of Witham, Essex. It is situated about half a mile (1 km) from the north of the town centre and is  down the line from London Liverpool Street. It is the junction for the Braintree Branch Line to the east, which opened in 1848; between 1848 and 1964, it was also the junction for a west-facing branch line to Maldon. Its three-letter station code is WTM.

The station was opened in 1843 by the Eastern Counties Railway. It is currently operated by Greater Anglia, who also operate all trains serving it, as part of the East Anglia franchise.

History

The station became a junction five years later with the opening of the Maldon, Witham & Braintree Railway (MW&B) for goods trains on 15 August 1848; passenger services on the line began on 2 October 1848. The MW&B was later absorbed by the ECR, which itself amalgamated with other companies in 1862 to form the Great Eastern Railway.

Accidents
On 1 January 1899 eight people were injured in a collision at Witham. At around 7:30 pm the 7:15 pm service from Maldon East collided side-long with a cattle train that was being shunted into a siding. Some of the cattle wagons were derailed, and some of the sheep aboard were killed. The incident was blamed on signalman error.

On 1 September 1905 the 09:27 London Liverpool Street to Cromer 14-coach express derailed whilst travelling at speed through the station. Ten passengers and a luggage porter were killed when several of the carriages somersaulted on to the platforms causing considerable damage to the rolling stock and the station. Seventy-one passengers were seriously injured. It remains to this day the worst single loss of life in a railway accident in Essex. In 2005, an opportunity to commemorate the centenary was missed and the incident is now largely forgotten. Ben Sainty, a signalman, whose quick action averted the next train hitting the wreckage, has a road named after him in the town: Ben Sainty Court.

Layout
Platform 1 is rarely used except for peak-hour services to and from London Liverpool Street starting or terminating at Witham; a limited number of through-trains towards London use this platform as well. Platform 1 was formerly used by trains on the now disused Witham-Maldon branch line. Platform 2 is typically used by services towards London and platform 3 is for country-bound trains. Platform 4 is for Braintree branch services; this platform may also be used by through eastbound services stopping during peak times to allow fast express trains to pass through unhindered. Some evening peak services terminating at Witham also use platform 4. A new passing loop is planned to the north of Witham to further enable express services to overtake stopping services in either direction.

The station's car park is situated next to the station. To access the car park from the station passengers once had to exit onto the street and take a substantial walk to the road bridge across the tracks situated just past the western end of the station, over the bridge and then down a residential road the other side of the tracks. Passengers campaigned for a remedy to this issue for many years. In 2001 funding was announced to build a footbridge direct from the station to the car park, but this was subsequently withdrawn indefinitely due to financial cutbacks following the collapse of Railtrack. Reports of a new funding package for a footbridge emerged in 2008. Work took place between in 2011 which included a new entrance at the station to provide access to and from the adjacent car park. The footbridge opened in August 2011. The improvements also saw new disabled parking facilities, a customer help point and information point and new sheltered cycle storage.

An 1897 survey of the station shows a small system of sidings on the down-side at the London end and also a siding with a turntable at the country end off the Braintree branch.  On the up-side there were sidings serving an auction mart and cattle pens at the London end; and the Maltings and a coal yard at the country end accessed from both the main line and the Maldon branch. The Maldon branch had at an earlier date been served by a triangular junction which facilitated direct running from Colchester but it is shown as disconnected in 1897.

Services
The typical off-peak service pattern:
4 tph (trains per hour) London Liverpool Street
1 tph 
1 tph 
1 tph  
1 tph .

The 07:05 to Norwich and 23:15 to Liverpool Street (the latter of which also serves ). All other times passengers must change at Colchester or Ipswich.

All services are operated by Greater Anglia. During peak times, service frequencies are increased and calling patterns may vary.

References

Railway stations in Essex
DfT Category C2 stations
Former Great Eastern Railway stations
Railway stations in Great Britain opened in 1843
Greater Anglia franchise railway stations
1843 establishments in England
Witham